The Minister for Veterans is a minister of the Government of New South Wales with responsibility for veterans' affairs in the state of New South Wales, Australia.

The Minister since 21 December 2021 is David Elliott, who also holds the Transport portfolio.

The Minister assists the Minister for Families, Communities and Disability Services administer her portfolio through the Stronger Communities cluster, in particular through the Department of Communities and Justice and a range of other government agencies.

List of ministers

See also 

List of New South Wales government agencies

References

Veterans